Nam Sung-yong (November 23, 1912 – February 20, 2001) was a Korean Olympian who won a bronze medal in the marathon at the 1936 Summer Olympics, completing the run in 2 hours, 31 minutes, and 42 seconds.

He was born in Junten (Suncheon), Japanese Korea and received higher education in Japan. Like the gold medalist Sohn Kee-chung, Nam Sung-yong used the Japanese pronunciation of his name, Nan Shōryū as Korea was then a part of the Japanese Empire.

After the Olympics, Nam Sung-yong worked at the Korean Sporting Association with Sohn Kee-chung.

References

1912 births
2001 deaths
People from Suncheon
Korean male long-distance runners
South Korean male long-distance runners
Korean male marathon runners
South Korean male marathon runners
Japanese male long-distance runners
Japanese male marathon runners
Olympic athletes of Japan
Olympic bronze medalists for Japan
Athletes (track and field) at the 1932 Summer Olympics
Medalists at the 1936 Summer Olympics
Olympic bronze medalists in athletics (track and field)
Sportspeople from South Jeolla Province